Tatyana Valeryevna Belan (born November 10, 1982) is a Belarus rhythmic gymnast. She won a silver medal at the 2000 Summer Olympics. She was born in Minsk, Belarus.

References 

1982 births
Living people
Belarusian rhythmic gymnasts
Olympic gymnasts of Belarus
Olympic silver medalists for Belarus
Olympic medalists in gymnastics
Medalists at the 2000 Summer Olympics
Gymnasts at the 2000 Summer Olympics
Gymnasts from Minsk